Eternal Fire is a 1985 Spanish drama film written and directed by José Ángel Rebolledo. It was entered into the 14th Moscow International Film Festival.

Cast
 Ángela Molina as Gabrielle
 Imanol Arias as Pierre
 François-Eric Gendron as Henry Robillot
 Ovidi Montllor as Estebanot
 Klara Badiola
 Ramón Barea as Bertrand
 Manuel de Blas as Padre Robillot
 Myriam De Maeztu as Jeanne Garat (as Myriam Maeztu)
 Juana Ginzo as Superiora convento
 Elena Irureta
 Amaia Lasa as Sor Sainte Therese
 Margarita Lascoiti as Madre Robillot

References

External links
 

1985 films
1985 drama films
Spanish drama films
1980s Spanish-language films
1980s Spanish films